Sri Krishna Devaraya Bhasha Nilayam earlier known as Sri Krishna Devaraya Andhra Bhasha Nilayam (Telugu: శ్రీ కృష్ణ దేవరాయాంధ్ర భాషా నిలయం) is one of the oldest non-Government Library in Telangana.

History
The library was started on 1 September 1901. The Bhasha Nilayam celebrated its silver jubilee in 1927 with Burgula Ramakrishna Rao as its secretary and golden jubilee in 1952 when Burgula became the Chief Minister. The poet laureate Sripada Krishna Sastry inaugurated the golden jubilee celebrations. The Nilayam celebrated its centenary in 2001. Madiraju Lakshmi Narasimha Rao, secretary of the Nilayam for the past over 50 years.

Among the leading personalities involved in the founding and strengthening of this institution in its formative years were the Munagala Raja, Nayani Venkata Ranga Rao, eminent researcher-historian Komarraju Lakshmana Rao, Pardhasarathi Apparao Bahadur of Palwancha, Suravaram Pratapareddy, Madapati Hanumantha Rao, Burgula Ramakrishna Rao, Adiraju Veerabhadra Rao and Raja Bahadur Venkatarama Reddy.

The Bhasha Nilayam was cradle of the nationalist struggle against the Nizam's rule and a center for Telugu language. Great people in politics, literature and culture considered it a privilege to address the gathering here.

Collection
There are about 40,000-odd books and old newspapers and magazines. The Sundarayya Vignana Kendram is helping the library in conservation, automation and electronic catalogueing. Four storied new building is being constructed during the Telugu Desam Party rule by generous Funding from the Government of Andhra Pradesh.

See also
 State Central Library, Hyderabad

References

1901 establishments in India
Libraries in Hyderabad, India
Libraries established in 1901